Colette Ripert (17 January 1930 – 20 May 1930 ) was a French actress.

Selected filmography
 Les jeux sont faits (1947)
 Eternal Conflict (1948)
 Keep an Eye on Amelia (1949)
 The Girl from Maxim's (1950)
 I Had Seven Daughters (1954)
 Faites-moi confiance (1954)
Your Turn, Callaghan (1955)
 Vice Squad (1959)
 They Killed a Corpse (1962)

References

External links

1930 births
1999 deaths
French film actresses
French television actresses
20th-century French actresses